Julie Bresset (born 9 June 1989, in Saint-Brieuc) is a French mountain bike cyclist, who won the cross-country mountain bike race in the 2012 Summer Olympics.

She was the overall winner of the World Cup mountain bike cross-country series in 2011 and finished top of women's elite cross-country ranking at the end of 2011.

She won the French national cross-country mountain bike championships in 2010, 2011 and 2012.

At her first Olympics in 2012, she took the lead, which she never relinquished, from the second lap. By the third lap, the gap between her and the chasing group was already twenty seconds. This was her first international individual title at the senior level. She was on the start list of 2018 Cross Country European Championships and finished 11. .

References

External links

1989 births
Living people
French female cyclists
Olympic gold medalists for France
Cyclists at the 2012 Summer Olympics
Olympic medalists in cycling
Olympic cyclists of France
Sportspeople from Saint-Brieuc
Medalists at the 2012 Summer Olympics
UCI Mountain Bike World Champions (women)
Cyclists from Brittany
21st-century French women